Big Boy, Bigboy or Big Boys may refer to:

Food
 Big Boy Restaurants, the overall restaurant chain and franchises
 Bob's Big Boy, original, California regional Big Boy restaurant chain franchise
 Frisch's Big Boy, a midwestern regional Big Boy restaurant chain franchise
 Big Boy tomato

People
 Big Boy (nickname), a list of people
 Bigboy Matlapeng (born 1958), Botswanan long-distance runner
 Perrance Shiri (born Bigboy Samson Chikerema in 1955), Zimbabwean air marshal

Film and theater
 Big Boy (musical), a 1925 Broadway production starring Al Jolson
 Big Boy (film), a 1930 musical comedy starring Al Jolson as a jockey riding the horse Big Boy

Music

Artists
 Big Boys, a band
 Arthur Crudup (1905–1974), American singer and guitarist
 Big Boy Goudie (1899–1964), American jazz musician
 Arthur "Big Boy" Spires (1912–1990), American blues singer and guitarist
 Big Boy (rapper) (born 1975), Puerto Rican rap and reggaeton songwriter born Gustavo Roy Diaz in 1975

Albums
Big Boy (EP), by Charlotte Cardin
Big Boy (eLDee album)

Songs
 "Big Boy" (song), by The Jackson 5
 "Big Boy", a song by Sparks in the film Rollercoaster
 "Big Boys", a song by Elvis Costello from Armed Forces (1979)
 "Big Boys", a song by Chuck Berry from Chuck (2017)
 "Big Boys", a Saturday Night Live skit by SZA, Keke Palmer, Ego Nwodim, Punkie Johnson and Cecily Strong

Other uses
 Big Boy Junction, Tennessee, an unincorporated community
 Big Boy Peak, a mountain in Idaho
 Union Pacific Big Boy, a class of steam locomotives
 Alphonse "Big Boy" Caprice, a Dick Tracy character
 Big Boy (radio host) (born 1969), host on Los Angeles station KRRL
 Henry Big Boy, a rifle by Henry Repeating Arms

See also
 Peter Miller (musician) (born 1942), English singer, songwriter and record producer also known as "Big Boy Pete"
 Big Boi (born 1975), American musician
 Little Boy (disambiguation)